Laosia may refer to:
 Laosia (plant), a genus of plants in the family Podostemaceae
 Laosia, a genus of gastropods in the family Cyclophoridae, synonym of Laotia
 Laosia, a genus of beetles in the family Chrysomelidae, synonym of Laosaltica